Garzoubanthon or Orgibate was a town on the Black Sea coast of ancient Paphlagonia, a station on the road heading east of Sinope during Byzantine times.

It is located near Kurzuvet in Asiatic Turkey.

References

Populated places in ancient Paphlagonia
Former populated places in Turkey
History of Sinop Province
Populated places of the Byzantine Empire